The 'Cuse may refer to

 Syracuse University
 the Syracuse Orange athletic teams
 the city of Syracuse, New York